Yuan Mincheng (born 8 August 1995) is a Chinese professional footballer of Korean descent who currently plays for Chinese Super League club Shenzhen.

Club career
Yuan Mincheng joined China League Two side Guangxi Longguida in 2015 after he failed to promote to Yanbian FC's first team squad. He moved to Nantong Zhiyun in 2016 when Nantong bought the first team of Guangxi Longguida as well as their position in the China League Two.

Yuan transferred to Chinese Super League side Chongqing Lifan on 28 February 2017. On 3 May 2017, he made his debut for Chongqing in the 2017 Chinese FA Cup in a 1–0 away defeat against China League Two club Heilongjiang Lava Spring, coming on as a substitute for Li Fang in the 80th minute. His first Super League debut came on three days later on 6 May 2017 in a 3–2 loss against Henan Jianye as the benefit of the new rule of the league that at least one Under-23 player must be in the starting line-up and was substituted off by Wang Weicheng in the 14th minute. On 20 October 2018, he scored his first senior goal in a 4–4 home draw against Hebei China Fortune.

On 8 April 2021, Yuan joined fellow Chinese Super League club Shenzhen, reuniting with his former head coach Cruyff.

Career statistics
.

References

External links
 

1995 births
Living people
Chinese footballers
Association football defenders
People from Yanbian
Nantong Zhiyun F.C. players
Chongqing Liangjiang Athletic F.C. players
Chinese Super League players
China League Two players
Chinese people of Korean descent
Footballers from Jilin